LeBeau or Le Beau is a French surname. Notable people with the surname include:

 Anita Lebeau, Canadian filmmaker and director of the 2003 animated short Louise
 Bettina Le Beau (1932–2015), Belgian actress
 Charles le Beau (1701–1778), French historical writer
 Charles-Louis Lebeau (1812–1882), Belgian politician in the Charleroi
 Chris Lebeau (1878–1945), Dutch artist
 Désirée Le Beau (1907-1993), Austro-Hungarian-American industrial chemist
 Dick LeBeau (born 1937), American Hall of Fame football player, defensive coordinator, and head coach
 Dominique Lebeau (born 1975), Canadian musician formerly in Les Cowboys Fringants
 Gary LeBeau (born 1947), American politician
 Gilles Lebeau (born 1954), French mathematician
 Joseph Lebeau (1794–1865), second Prime Minister of Belgium
 Luise Adolpha Le Beau (1850–1927), German composer of classical music
 Madeleine Lebeau (1923–2016),  French actress
 Paul Lebeau (1868–1959), French chemist
 Paul Lebeau (writer) (1908–1982), Flemish writer
 Pierre Lebeau (born 1954),  Canadian actor
 Pierre le Beau (born 1986), German footballer
 Patrick Lebeau (born 1970), Canadian ice hockey player
 Rebekah LeBeau, American singer-songwriter and daughter of Contemporary Christian music artist Keith Green
 Richard Lebeau (born 1953), French Egyptologist, historian
 Stéphan Lebeau (born 1968), Canadian ice hockey player 
 Suzanne Lebeau (born 1948), Canadian playwright and actress
 William H. Lebeau (born 1938), American rabbi

Fictional characters:
 Corporal Louis LeBeau, on the TV series Hogan's Heroes
 Gambit (Marvel Comics) (Remy LeBeau), Marvel Comics superhero 
 Roy LeBeau, pen name of American crime and science fiction author Mitchell Smith

French-language surnames